James Benjamin Hart was an Ontario merchant and political figure. He represented Prince Edward in the Legislative Assembly of Ontario from 1883 to 1886 as a Liberal member.

He was born in Lennox County. In 1841, he married Sarah Ann Demorest. Hart served as reeve for Sophiasburgh Township. He lived in Picton.

External links 
The Canadian parliamentary companion, 1885 JA Gemmill

1820 births
1898 deaths
Ontario Liberal Party MPPs
People from Prince Edward County, Ontario